Zheltoyarovo is a rural locality (a selo) and the administrative center of Zheltoyarovsky Selsoviet of Svobodnensky District, Amur Oblast, Russia. The population was 458 as of 2018. There are 6 streets.

Geography 
Zheltoyarovo is located on the right bank of the Zeya River, 36 km northeast of Svobodny (the district's administrative centre) by road. Gashchenka is the nearest rural locality.

References 

Rural localities in Svobodnensky District